Gaston Dupray (8 June 1886 – 12 December 1976) was a Belgian film actor.

Dupray was born Gaston Joseph Dopère in Schaerbeek and died in 1976 in Ixelles. Dupray spent most of his film career working in French cinema.

Selected filmography
 Atlantis (1930)
 Hai-Tang (1930)
 A Caprice of Pompadour (1931)
 The Lacquered Box (1932)
 Night Shift (1932)
 Little Jacques (1934)
 Parisian Life (1936)
 The Man from Nowhere (1937)
Judicial Error (1948)

External links

1886 births
1976 deaths
Belgian male stage actors
Belgian male film actors
Belgian male silent film actors
20th-century Belgian male actors
People from Schaerbeek